"Typa Girl" is a song recorded by South Korean girl group Blackpink.  It is the third track on group's second studio album, Born Pink (2022), which was released on September 16, 2022, through YG and Interscope. It is a hip-hop, pop and electronic song with a trap beat and synth. It was written by Bekuh Boom and produced by Boom and Dominsuk. Lyrically, the track sees the group speak confidently about being the type of person that everyone wants.

"Typa Girl" peaked at number 16 on the Billboard Global 200 and was a top-ten hit in Hong Kong, Indonesia, Malaysia, Philippines, Singapore, and Vietnam. Although it did not enter the US Billboard Hot 100, it debuted at number 14 on the Bubbling Under Hot 100 chart.

Background 
"Typa Girl" was announced as the third track of Born Pink on September 7, 2022, through the group's official social media accounts. The song was released alongside the album on September 16, 2022 by YG and Interscope. "Typa Girl" was included on the set list of Blackpink's Born Pink World Tour (2022–23), where it was performed by the group with all-new choreography.

Lyrics and production 
In an interview with Variety, Boom said that she had written the demo for the song in 2021 at The Black Label's studio and she had originally "thought Lisa might use it for her next solo single". She further described it as a "song to empower women".

"Typa Girl" was produced and written by Bekuh Boom with additional production credits from Dominsuk. It is a slow hip-hop, pop, and electronic song that features heavy trap beats and synth. It's incorporates organ, brass sounds, and piano chords in its production. Where it began with a soft piano tune at the intro "that rings like a bell before the hi-hats and snares hit on the beat drop", before it changed into new remastered MIDI sound. In terms of musical notation, the song is written in the key of  G Major with a tempo of 132 beats per minutes. The Korea Herald described it as a "hardcore hip hop", where the lyrics talks about "How can a powerful and wealthy woman captive a man and put him under her spell".

Critical reception 
Writing for Teen Vogue, Devon Abelman praised "Typa Girl" as an empowering anthem that showed off "Blackpink's signature sassy-yet-genius wordplay."

Commercial performance 
"Typa Girl" debuted at number 16 on the Billboard Global 200 and at number 13 on the Billboard Global Excl. US. In South Korea, the song debuted at number 140 and peaked at number 93 on the Circle Digital Chart, and also peaked at number 20 on Billboards South Korea Songs chart. "Typa Girl" debuted at number 93 on the UK Singles Chart, the group's eleventh entry on the chart. In the United States, the song did not enter the Billboard Hot 100, but did peak at number 14 on the Billboard Bubbling Under Hot 100 chart. It also entered in the top ten in Hong Kong, Indonesia, Malaysia, Philippines, Singapore, and Vietnam.

Cover versions 
American singer-songwriter Tori Kelly covered the song in an acoustic version posted in her TikTok account.

Accolades

Charts

Weekly charts

Monthly charts

References

2022 songs
Blackpink songs
Electronic songs
South Korean pop songs
South Korean hip hop songs
English-language South Korean songs